Turnagain may refer to:

 Turnagain Arm, a waterway into the northwestern part of the Gulf of Alaska
 Cape Turnagain, a prominent headland on the east coast of New Zealand's North Island
 Turnagain Island (Queensland), an island
 Turnagain Pass, a mountain pass just south of the municipal limits of Anchorage, Alaska
 Turnagain River, a river in the Canadian province of British Columbia

See also